Golema Crcorija is a village in the municipality of Kriva Palanka, North Macedonia.

Demographics
According to the 2021 census, the village had a total of 18 inhabitants. Ethnic groups in the village include:

Macedonians 16
Albanians 1
Persons from whom data was taken from administrative sources 1

References

Villages in Kriva Palanka Municipality